Fan commonly refers to:

 Fan (machine), a machine for producing airflow, often used for cooling
 Hand fan, an implement held and waved by hand to move air for cooling
 Fan (person), short for fanatic; an enthusiast or supporter, especially with regard to entertainment

Fan, FAN or fans may also refer to:

Arts, entertainment, and media

Music 
 "Fan" (song), by Pascal Michel Obispo
 Fans (album), a 1984 album by Malcolm McLaren
 "Fans" (song), a 2007 album track on Because of the Times by the Kings of Leon

Other uses in arts, entertainment, and media
 Fan (film), a 2016 Indian Hindi film
 Fan, a character in the video game Yie Ar Kung-Fu

Biology 
 Free amino nitrogen, in brewing and winemaking, amino acids available for yeast metabolism
 Sea fan, a marine animal of the cnidarian phylum

Computing and mathematics
 Fan (geometry), the set of all planes through a given line
 Fan (order), a class of preorderings on a field
 FAN algorithm, an algorithm for automatic test pattern generation
 Fan triangulation, a fast method to decompose a convex polygon in triangles
 .fan filename extension for the Fantom (programming language)
 File area network, a method for file sharing over a network
 Triangle fan, a data structure to describe polygons in computer graphics
 Fan, a type of polyhedral complex

Geology 
One of several types of fan-shaped deposits of sediment caused by the flow of streams or glacial melt:
 Abyssal fan,  underwater geological structures linked with large-scale sediment deposition.
 Alluvial fan
 Outwash plain

People 
 Fan (surname) (Chinese character: 范, pinyin: Fàn), a common Chinese surname
 Fan Clan, a prominent clan with the above surname during the Spring and Autumn Period of China
 Fán (surname) (Chinese character: 樊, pinyin: Fán), a common Chinese surname
 Fan, the legendary descendant of the Yellow Emperor claimed as the progenitor of the Su clan in China

Places 
 Fan (river), river in Albania
 Fan, Albania, municipality in Albania
 Fan County, in Henan, China
 Fan district, historic district in Richmond, Virginia
 Fanling station, Hong Kong; MTR station code FAN

Technology 
 Future Air Navigation System, or FAN, an air traffic control scheme
 Turbofan, a type of jet engine
 Winnowing fan, device for winnowing grain

Weapons 
 Japanese war fan, an object used in Japanese feudal warfare, also used in martial arts
 Korean fighting fan, an object used in Korean martial arts

Other uses
 Armed Forces of the North, a Chadian rebel army (French: Forces Armées du Nord)
 Fan (cards), to spread playing cards fanwise
 Fan (Daoism), 反 philosophical concept of "return; reverse; repeat"
 Fang language, ISO 639-2 code
 Nicaraguan Air Force (Spanish: Fuerza Aérea Nicaragüense)

See also 

 The Fan (disambiguation)
 
 Fandom (disambiguation)
 Fanfan (disambiguation)
 Fanning (disambiguation)